Astrophel may refer to:
 Astrophel and Stella, a poem by Philip Sidney
 Astrophel (Edmund Spenser), a poem by Edmund Spenser